Mitochondrial 5-demethoxyubiquinone hydroxylase (DMQ hydroxylase), also known as coenzyme Q7, hydroxylase,  is an enzyme that in humans is encoded by the COQ7 gene.  The clk-1 (clock-1) gene encodes this protein that is necessary for ubiquinone biosynthesis in the worm Caenorhabditis elegans and other eukaryotes. The mouse version of the gene is called mclk-1 and the human, fruit fly and yeast homolog COQ7 (coenzyme Q biosynthesis protein 7).

CLK-1 is not to be confused with the unrelated human protein CLK1 which plays a role in RNA splicing.

Structure 

The protein has two repeats of approximately 90 amino acids, that contain two conserved motifs predicted to be important for coordination of iron. The structure and function of the gene are highly conserved among different species.

The C. elegans protein contains 187 amino acid residues (20 kilodaltons), the human homolog 217 amino acid residues (24 kilodaltons, gene consisting of  six exons spanning 11 kb and located on chromosome 16).

Mitochondrial function
Ubiquinone is a small redox active lipid that is found in most cellular membranes where it acts as a cofactor in numerous cellular redox processes, including mitochondrial electron transport. As a cofactor, ubiquinone is often involved in processes that produce reactive oxygen species (ROS). In addition, ubiquinone is one of the main endogenous antioxidants of the cell. The CLK-1 enzyme is responsible for the  hydroxylation of 5-demethoxyubiquinone to 5-hydroxyubiquinone.

It has been shown that mutations in the gene are associated with increased lifespan. Defects of the gene slow down a variety of developmental and physiological processes, including the cell cycle, embryogenesis, post-embryonic growth, rhythmic behaviors and aging.

Nuclear function
CLK-1 and COQ7 predominantly localise to mitochondria to participate in the ubiquinone biosynthetic pathway which is found there. However, a small pool of CLK-1 and COQ7 translocates to the nucleus in response to the production of ROS by normally functioning mitochondria in both worms and human cells, respectively. Translocation of CLK-1 and COQ7 represents a mitochondrial to nuclear retrograde signalling pathway that acts to suppress mitochondrial stress responses. The mitochondrial and nuclear pools of CLK-1 are thought to contribute independently to worm lifespan regulation. The nuclear form of CLK-1 and COQ7 is thought to regulate gene expression through an unidentified mechanism.

References

Further reading

External links 

 
 

EC 1.13
Ageing
Aging-related genes